Robert S. Stokes (June 8, 1931 – July 5, 2019) was an American football player, coach of football and basketball, and college athletics administrator. He served as the head football coach at Muskingum College from 1967 to 1969, compiling a record of 19–5–3. Stokes was also the head basketball coach at Ashland University from 1958 to 1965 and Muskingum from 1965 to 1967, amassing a career college basketball coaching mark of 99–92.

Head coaching record

Football

References

External links
 Ashland Sports Hall of Fame profile
 

1931 births
2019 deaths
Ashland Eagles athletic directors
Ashland Eagles football coaches
Ashland Eagles men's basketball coaches
Basketball coaches from Ohio
Chicago Cardinals players
Muskingum Fighting Muskies men's basketball coaches
Muskingum Fighting Muskies football coaches
Muskingum Fighting Muskies football players
High school basketball coaches in Ohio
High school football coaches in Ohio
People from Muskingum County, Ohio
Players of American football from Ohio